Bill Bain (18 December 1929 in Wauchope, New South Wales, Australia – 21 February 1982 in London, England) was an Australian television and film director.

Biography

Australia
Bill Bain originally trained as a school teacher, but became a pioneer of Australian television after he joined the fledgling Australian Broadcasting Corporation in the 1950s.

In Australia, he directed the country's first TV pantomime for Christmas in 1959. He also directed the TV plays Corinth House (1961) and Funnel Web (1962).

Britain
He left Australia in 1963 for Europe and directed numerous episodes of British television series, including Harpers West One, Emerald Soup, The Avengers, Callan, Redcap, Upstairs Downstairs, The Duchess of Duke Street, Enemy at the Door, The Brack Report, and Armchair Theatre.   

It was noteworthy that "For many, Upstairs, Downstairs and The Duchess of Duke Street typify excellence in British television drama. The leading director for both series was Bill Bain, an Australian".

For Amicus he directed a feature film What Became of Jack and Jill?. Bain called the film "a savage indictment of the shallow education young people get today." Another 'one off' was a TV adaptation of a Noël Coward short story called Pretty Polly in which he directed Lynn Redgrave. On location in Sri Lanka, he directed an episode of the 1973 Australian-British-German series Elephant Boy based on the Rudyard Kipling story Toomai of the Elephants.

Bain returned to Australia briefly in 1973 where he lamented the quality of local television. He came back in 1975 to attempt to set up a $1 million feature about opal mining.

He won an Emmy Award in 1975 for Outstanding Directing in a Drama Series for his work on the Upstairs, Downstairs episode "The Sudden Storm".

In 1979, he returned to Australia for three months to be a consultant at the Film and Television School. 

In 1968, he married the British actress Rosemary Frankau and they had two sons Matthew and Sam Bain.

He died in St Stephens Hospital in London aged 52. The cause of his death was melanoma.

Select filmography
Corinth House (1961)
Harlequinade (1961)
The Little Woman (1962)
Fly by Night (1962)
Funnel Web (1962)
Emerald Soup (1963)
The Tilted Screen (1966)
The Importance of Being Earnest (1968)
All Out for Kangaroo Valley (1969)
What Became of Jack and Jill? (1972) - feature

References

External links

1929 births
1982 deaths
Australian film directors
Australian television directors
Emmy Award winners
Australian expatriates in the United Kingdom
Frankau family